Fogn is an island in Stavanger municipality in Rogaland county, Norway. The Finnøyfjorden lies between Fogn and Finnøy and the Fognafjorden lies between Fogn and the mainland to the southeast. Fogn Church is located on the island.

The island is especially well known for its large production of tomatoes in greenhouses, about 15 percent of Norway's total production. This employs large amounts of foreign labor on the island.  There are about 354 inhabitants on the island (2014), with many more summer residents who live in summer cottages on the island.  The island has its own kindergarten and an elementary school that provides education through 7th grade. Starting with 8th grade, students must take the boat to middle school, located on the island of Finnøy.

There is no road connection to the island.  There are regular ferry connections to Judaberg on Finnøy island as well as to some of the other small surrounding islands, and on to the mainland.

See also
List of islands of Norway

References

Islands of Stavanger